Clivina sacra is a species of ground beetle in the subfamily Scaritinae. It was described by Jules Putzeys in 1875.

References

sacra
Beetles described in 1875